The 2014–15 Dallas Sidekicks season was the third season of the relaunched Dallas Sidekicks professional indoor soccer club. The Sidekicks, a Southern Division team in the Major Arena Soccer League, played their home games in the Allen Event Center in Allen, Texas.

The team was led by head coach Tatu with assistant coach Nick Stavrou. Dallas amassed a 14–6 record in the regular season and qualified for the playoffs. They defeated Oxford City FC of Texas in the Southern Division Semi-Finals before losing to the Monterrey Flash in the Division Finals.

Season summary

The Sidekicks stumbled with an opening night loss to the Missouri Comets, the 2013–14 champion of the Major Indoor Soccer League. and suffered their first regular season home loss since the team returned in 2012. The team regrouped and won the next seven consecutive games before a controversial road loss to Hidalgo La Fiera at a practice facility that did not meet MASL standards. The league vacated the results of that game and Dallas regrouped to defeat Oxford City FC of Texas on the road. A loss at home to the same team plus three road losses in Mexico gave the Sidekicks their first regular season multi-game losing streak in the arena soccer era. Dallas regained its footing and won 6 straight games before a final loss at home to the Monterrey Flash to end the regular season. The team finished with a 14–6 record and second place in the Southern Division. The Sidekicks hosted Oxford City FC of Texas in the Southern Division Semi-Final and won 6–5. They faced the Monterrey Flash on the road on Sunday, March 8, in the Southern Division Final and lost 1–11.

History
With some continuity in ownership, coaching, and players, the Sidekicks claim the heritage of the original Dallas Sidekicks that won four championships as members of four leagues (MISL I, CISL, PSA/WISL, and MISL II) while playing at Reunion Arena in Dallas from 1984 to 2004. The new Sidekicks debuted as members of the Professional Arena Soccer League at the Allen Event Center in November 2012, posting a 13–3 record during the 2012–13 season before falling to the Rio Grande Valley Flash in the playoffs. For the 2013–14 season, the Sidekicks returned largely intact both in the front office and on the field, with a few roster additions to bolster the offense and improved to 14 wins and 2 losses. The team finished second in the Central Division but lost to the Monterrey Flash in the first round of the playoffs.

Off-field moves
In May 2014, the Professional Arena Soccer League added six teams from the failed third incarnation of the Major Indoor Soccer League and reorganized as the Major Arena Soccer League. The 2014–15 MASL season will be 20 games long, 4 more than the 16 regular season games of recent PASL seasons. With the league expansion and reorganization, the Sidekicks moved from the Central division to the new Southern division. The other Southern teams for 2014–15 are the Brownsville Barracudas, Hidalgo La Fiera, Monterrey Flash, Saltillo Rancho Seco, and Beaumont-based Oxford City FC of Texas.

This season's regular home and road jerseys are supplied by Lotto Team Sport USA. The team also wore special pink jerseys on October 25 to honor Breast Cancer Awareness Month and special camouflage jerseys to honor Veteran's Day on November 15. The special jerseys were auctioned to raise funds for related charities. For the second consecutive season, the primary jersey sponsor is Starwood Motors.

On December 6, the Sidekicks began distributing player trading cards to fans at home games with each fan receiving 2 cards of a planned 18-card set. This is the current Sidekicks' third such set and the second to be produced for the team by Panini America. The set includes head coach Tatu plus Sagu, Jamie Lovegrove, Nestor Hernandez, Carlos Videla, Shaun David, Ricardinho, Angel Rivillo, Dominic Schell, Cameron Brown, Kiley Couch, Cody Ellis, Fabinho, Mike Jones, Dejan "Milo" Milosevic, Freddy Moojen, Renato Pereira, and Kristian Quintana.

Roster moves
In August 2014, veteran defender Nick Stavrou retired after 14 seasons as a player to become the Sidekicks' director of soccer operations and an assistant coach, replacing Cesar Cervin. With the team's roster depleted by injury and penalty, Stavrou returned to the turf as a defender for the December 14 game against the Tulsa Revolution. He returned briefly to retirement on December 27 before being recalled on January 8 for roadtrip to Mexico and again on January 23 for a roadtrip to Brownsville.

On August 14, 2014, the team re-signed forward Bronil Koochoie for the upcoming season then later traded him to the Turlock Express. On September 25, the team signed veteran player Frederico "Freddy" Moojen. Previously signed with the Baltimore Blast, his contract was voided when the MISL collapsed.

The team conducted pre-season tryouts and training camp at Soccer Spectrum in Richardson, Texas, to fill out and upgrade the team's 20-man roster. MASL rules allow each team to dress up to 14 active players for each regular season game.

On October 24, the team signed midfielder Kristian Quintana to a contract. On October 25, star forward Nestor Hernandez was placed on the 30-day injured reserve list following knee surgery. On November 1, Kristian Quintana was assigned to Sidekicks Premier and rookie forward Thomas Knight Jr. was signed to a contract. On November 11, Quintana rejoined the team and defender George Williams was assigned to Sidekicks Premier. On November 22, defender Dominic Schell was signed to a contract and Thomas Knight Jr. was assigned to Sidekicks Premier.

On December 12, Nestor Hernandez was activated from the injured reserve list and midfielder Gustavo Piedra was assigned to Sidekicks Premier. On December 20, Piedra was recalled to the team, defenders Fernando Garza and R.J. Luevano were signed to contracts, defender London Woodberry and forward Renato Pereira were assigned to Sidekicks Premier, and defender Michael Uremovich was placed on the 14-day injured reserve list. On December 27, Piedra and forward Arthur Ivo were assigned to Sidekicks Premier and Pereira returned to the lineup.

The team began a series of roster moves on January 8 in preparation for the roadtrip to Mexico. Defender Mike Jones, midfielders Angel Rivillo and Kristian Quintana, and forward Renato Pereira were assigned to Sidekicks Premier. On the same day, defender Nick Stavrou was re-activated plus Brazilian and Mexican nationals John Machado and Andreas Salazar were signed as midfielders and Johnny Munoz was signed as a defender. On January 16, the team assigned Machado, Salazar, and Munoz to Sidekicks Premier, Stavrou was once again sent into retirement, and the team signed midfielder Alex Molano. On the same day, the Sidekicks acquired forward Alex Megson in a trade with the Rochester Lancers.

On January 17, the day before the Sidekicks hosted Oxford City FC of Texas, defender R.J. Leuvano was assigned to Sidekicks Premier while forward Arthur Ivo and midfielders Angel Rivillo and Kristian Quintana were recalled to the Sidekicks' roster. In preparation for a weekend two-game road trip to face the Brownsville Barracudas, the team returned Rivillo to Sidekicks Premier, recalled defender Mike Jones, and placed forward Shaun David on the injured reserve list with season-ending plantar fasciitis.

On February 1, the final day for roster moves this season, the team signed MLS veteran Hunter Jumper, recalled midfielder Angel Rivillo, activated Shaun David from injured reserve, returned defender Nick Stavrou to his coaching duties, and granted midfielder Jamie Lovegrove emergency leave to return to England.

Schedule

Pre-season

Regular season

 League vacated results on December 23 after upholding Dallas' protest of playing conditions.
 Originally scheduled for Hidalgo La Fiera but rescheduled after that team left the league mid-season.
 Mini-game to replace vacated Hidalgo game, maintaining 20-game schedule.
 Replaces Hidalgo game originally scheduled for that date.

Post-season

Personnel

Player roster
As of March 8, 2015

Other players that logged time on the field for the Sidekicks this season include forwards #00 Thomas Knight, Jr. and #30 Renato Pereira; midfielders #32 Jamie Lovegrove, #19 Gustavo Piedra, #2 John Machado, and #16 Andreas Salazar; plus defenders #28 Dean Lovegrove, #2 London Woodberry, #84 Michael Uremovich, #84 R.J. Luevano, #84 Johnny Munoz, and #12 George Williams. Assistant coach Nick Stavrou also suited up as a defender (#23) for several games.

Only two players (#4 Kiley Couch and #15 Cameron Brown) participated in all 20 of the Sidekicks' regular season games. #14 Fabinho Leite missed only the December 14 home game versus the Tulsa Revolution.

Staff
The ownership group during this season included majority owner Ronnie Davis as team president and CEO, plus vice president Missy Davis, and minority owners Tatu (who also served as head coach), J.L. "Sonny" Williams, and Jim Tolbert. Assistant coach Nick Stavrou was also the team's Director of Soccer Operations. The team's athletic trainer was Steve Parker and Steve Wagner was the team chaplain. The team's public relations and communications director was Melissa Smith.

All of the Sidekicks' home games were aired live in high-definition on Time Warner Cable Sports Channel. The broadcast team included Norm Hitzges on play by play, former Sidekicks coach Gordon Jago with color commentary, and Alan Balthrop as broadcast statistician. Most MASL games were streamed by Go Live Sports with select games, including the October 25 season opener, streamed live by ESPN3. The in-arena announcer was KTCK personality Ty Walker.

Awards and honors
Dallas forward Freddy Moojen was selected for the 2014-15 MASL All-League Third Team.

Dallas' Cameron Brown earned honorable mention for the league's all-rookie team for 2014-15.

References

External links
Dallas Sidekicks official website
Dallas Sidekicks at The Dallas Morning News
Dallas Sidekicks at Allen American
Dallas Sidekicks at Dallas Entertainment Journal
2014–15 season at KicksFan.com

Dallas Sidekicks (2012–present) seasons
Dallas Sidekicks
Dallas Sidekicks 2014
Dallas Sidekicks
Dallas Sidekicks